Nowa Wieś  is a village in the administrative district of Gmina Długosiodło, within Wyszków County, Masovian Voivodeship, in east-central Poland.

The village has a population of 103.

References

Villages in Wyszków County